Gallarati may refer to:

 Dionisio Gallarati (1923-2019), Italian mathematician, specialised in algebraic geometry
 Gian Giacomo Gallarati Scotti (1886-1983), Italian politician and diplomat
 Villa Gallarati Scotti, Vimercate, rural palace located nearVimercate, Province of Monza and Brianza, Italy
 Villa Scheilbler Gallarati Scotti, Rho, 16th-century hunting lodge and rural palace located in Rho, Province of Milan, Italy

See also 
 Gallarate